Jacobus (Jac) van Looy (12 September 1855 – 24 February 1930) was a Dutch painter and writer.

Biography

Van Looy was the son of a carpenter, but his father lost his job when his eyesight began to fail. His mother died when he was five years old and when his father died soon afterwards, he ended up in the Haarlem municipal orphanage. He trained to become a house painter, but was able to follow drawing classes, from 1877 at the "Rijksacademie van Beeldende Kunsten" in Amsterdam.

In 1884, he received the Prix de Rome, which allowed him to travel. The years 1885-86 he spent traveling through Italy, Spain, and Morocco. He was a pupil of August Allebé, Jan Jacob Goteling Vinnis, Dirk Jan Hendrik Joosten, and Hendrik Jacobus Scholten.
There he began to draw sketches, which are collected in two volumes.  Until 1894 he lived in Amsterdam, when he married Titia van Gelder and moved to Soest. In 1901, he spent another year in Spain and Morocco. He moved back to Haarlem in 1913, when the orphanage where he grew up was converted to the Frans Hals Museum. He bought a house on the corner of the Haarlemmerhout park, where he was often seen taking walks and served as an inspiration for Godfried Bomans, among others. After his death this house was converted to a museum in his name (now only visible with a plaque on the facade).

Paintings

For many years, he belonged to the editorial staff of the literary monthly De Nieuwe Gids (The New Guide). He is one of the most typical authors of De Beweging van Tachtig (The Movement of the 1880s). He was a member of the Amsterdam artist society Arti et Amicitiae. He idolised words, especially in his travel books. He was an Epicurean and wrote with imagination about the outward appearance of our everyday life. The Teylers Museum has a collection of his drawings from his travels. His pupils were Charlotte Bouten, Chris Huidekooper, Ella Pauw, Johan Vlaanderen, and Jan Vogelaar.

Literary works

Proza (1889)
Gekken (1892)
Feesten (1903)
De wonderlijke avonturen van Zebedeus (1910–1925)
'Een praatje over "vertalen" met eenige vertaalde fragmenten' (1912)
Reizen (1913)
Jaapje (1917). in the DBNL
Feesten (1920)
Jaap (1923)

De wonderlijke avonturen van Zebedeus (1925)
De wonderlijke avonturen van Zebedeus (1925)
Nieuw proza (1929)
Op reis (1929)
Jacob (1930)
Gedichten (only scans available) (1932)
Jaapje (1963)
Proza (1981)

His work has been hailed as epic, with tender humanity and a gentle wisdom. Notable written works include the short story, De Dood van mijn Poes (The Death of My Cat) and his autobiograpthe Netherlandshy, Jaapje (Jimmy). Many of his paintings are to be found in the Netherlands' leading museums.

Huis van Looy
In the years 1948-1976 the museum "Huis van Looy" became a gallery for modern art exhibitions. When it closed its doors, most of the collection and the accompanying archive was given to the Frans Hals Museum.
Since 1985, a five-yearly Jacobus van Looy-prize is awarded by the "Stichting Jacobus van Looy" to artists who have excelled both as a writer and a painter. So far, the prize has been awarded to Armando, Lucebert, Breyten Breytenbach, Charlotte Mutsaers, and Wim T. Schippers.

References

 Jacobus van Looy on artnet

External links

 Text of Gekken in Dutch
 Stichting Jacobus van Looy 
 

1855 births
1930 deaths
Dutch Impressionist painters
Dutch male writers
Artists from Haarlem
19th-century Dutch painters
Dutch male painters
Prix de Rome (Netherlands) winners
20th-century Dutch painters
19th-century Dutch male artists
20th-century Dutch male artists